Cognitive Science is a multidisciplinary peer-reviewed academic journal published by John Wiley & Sons on behalf of the Cognitive Science Society. It was established in 1977 and covers all aspects of cognitive science.

External links
 

English-language journals
Publications established in 1977
Cognitive science journals
Wiley (publisher) academic journals
Academic journals associated with learned and professional societies of the United States